Olesya [alternate spelling Olessia] Dudnik (Олеся Віталіївна Дудник; born August 15, 1974 in Zaporizhia, Ukraine) is a gymnastics coach and former artistic gymnast who competed internationally for the Soviet Union between 1988 and 1990.  She was the world champion on the vault in 1989 and is regarded as one of the greatest gymnasts ever on the balance beam.  Her brief competitive career was ended by injuries.

Career
When her athletic potential was discovered, Dudnik was sent to train at club Dynamo in Kropyvnytskyi. She was moderately successful in international junior meets. Her breakout performance came at the 1989 American Cup in Fort Worth, Texas, where she finished second in the individual all-around competition.

At the 1989 World Championships held in Stuttgart, Germany, Dudnik was a member of the gold medal-winning Soviet team, led by Svetlana Boginskaya and considered one of the most powerful women's line-ups ever assembled.  The team was so deep with talent that Dudnik did not qualify for the individual all-around competition due to a large error in her compulsory uneven bar routine.  However, in the event finals she won the gold medal on the vault.  While considered the favorite to win beam and after recording a perfect 10.0 for her optional routine, Dudnik had a large stumble on her dismount.  Nevertheless, the judges recognized the extreme and unprecedented difficulty of the routine, and she captured the silver medal.  She also placed fourth in the floor exercise.  She scored four perfect 10.0's during the competition.

Dudnik's gymnastics were a combination of artistic elegance and daring athleticism.  In the vaulting event she routinely stuck a rarely seen at those times double-twisting Yurchenko.  Her uneven bar routine included an Arabian tuck mount. Her balance beam routine included an aerial cartwheel to two step out layouts, a nearly laid-out full twisting somersault, and an exceptionally difficult round-off, flip-flop, triple-twisting dismount.  Moreover, Dudnik rarely had balance errors on any of these elements.  Her routine was so difficult that it would actually be worth a 9.9 under the 2001–2005 Code of Points, and a 6.4 under the 2009-2012 COP, even though the routine was not constructed to meet these guidelines.

Video footage from the World Championships shows Dudnik performing with a bandaged right foot.  The foot injury continued to nag her through the 1990 French Internationals.  Before the injury, Dudnik's floor routine consisted of an Arabian double front, a 2½ twist to punch barani, and a full-in pike dismount.  Later, she sustained a serious knee injury, and difficulties with rehabilitation brought her competitive career to an end.

Personal
In addition to injuries, Dudnik has endured personal tragedies.  Her parents died of illnesses they suffered in the aftermath of the Chernobyl nuclear disaster. In March 1994 she married Ukrainian wrestler Oleh Chapnyi, and the couple had a son born in 1995. International Gymnast magazine reported that Chapny, however, died in 2004.

Olesya Dudnik coached gymnastics at the Al Gezeera Sporting Club in Cairo, Egypt until 2017. She remarried in 2017 and currently resides in Redondo Beach, CA.

Competitive history

External links
Whatever Happened to... Olesya Dudnik
List of Competitive Results at Gymn Forum

1974 births
Living people
Ukrainian female artistic gymnasts
Soviet female artistic gymnasts
World champion gymnasts
Medalists at the World Artistic Gymnastics Championships
Sportspeople from Zaporizhzhia
European champions in gymnastics